Porrima may refer to:

 Porrima (scientific ship), an eco-experimental ship
 Antevorta, a goddess in Roman mythology
 Gamma Virginis, a star in the constellation Virgo
 Schinia, a genus of insects known as flower moths